Erich von Neusser (23 October 1902 – 30 August 1957) was an Austrian film producer.

Selected filmography
 Turandot, Princess of China (1935)
 The Girl Irene (1936)
 My Son the Minister (1937)
 Diamonds (1937)
 A Girl Goes Ashore (1938)
 A Mother's Love (1939)
 Woman in the River (1939)
 My Daughter Lives in Vienna (1940)
 The White Dream (1943)
 The Emperor Waltz (1953)
 The Congress Dances (1955)
 Espionage (1955)

References

Bibliography 
 Giesen, Rolf. Nazi Propaganda Films: A History and Filmography. McFarland & Company, 2003.

External links 
 

 
1902 births
1957 deaths
Film people from Brno
People from the Margraviate of Moravia
Moravian-German people
Austrian film producers